Tonio is an Italian and Spanish given name and nickname in use in Italy, Spain, parts of the United States, Mexico, Cuba, Dominican Republic, Guatemala, Honduras, El Salvador, Nicaragua, Costa Rica, Western Panama, Colombia, Venezuela, Peru, Ecuador, Bolivia, Chile, Paraguay, Argentina, Uruguay, and the Falkland Islands. As a given name it is a diminutive form of Antonio. Notable people with the name include the following:

Given name
Tonio Arango (born 1963), German actor
Tonio Biondini (born 1945), Italian cross-country skier
Tonio Borg (born 1957), Maltese politician
Tonio di Paolo, American opera singer.
Tonio Fenech (born 1969), Maltese politician
Tonio Mallia (born 1955), Maltese judge
Tonio Teklić (born 1999), Croatian footballer

Nickname/stagename
Tonio K (born Steven M. Krikorian, 1950), American singer/songwriter
Tonio Selwart, nickname of Antonio Franz Theus Selmair-Selwart (1896 – 2002), German actor
Vitantonio Liuzzi known as Tonio (born 1980), Italian racing driver

Fictional Characters
Tonio, the baritone fool in the Italian opera, Pagliacci
Tonio Trussardi, a chef from the anime/manga Diamond is Unbreakable

See also

Tokio (given name)
Tondo (disambiguation)
Tongo (disambiguation)
Tonho (name)
Toni, name
Tonia (name)
Tonic (disambiguation)
Tonie, name
Tonin (name)
Tonino (disambiguation)
Toñito (name)
Tonko
Tono (name)
Tonto (disambiguation)

Notes

Italian masculine given names
Spanish masculine given names